The European Union Agency for the Operational Management of Large-Scale IT Systems in the Area of Freedom, Security and Justice (eu-LISA) is an agency of the European Union (EU) that was founded in 2011 to ensure the uninterrupted operation of large-scale IT systems within the area of freedom, security and justice (AFSJ), that are instrumental in the implementation of the asylum, border management and migration policies of the EU. It began its operational activities on 1 December 2012. The current establishing regulation entered into force on 11 December 2018, repealing the previous regulation and expanding the Agency's mandate. The new mandate strengthens the Agency's capacity to improve, design and develop information systems for European security, border management and migration, and broadens the scope of the Agency's work on research, innovation, testing and on the possibility to support the development of pilot projects and proofs of concept. 

eu-LISA's headquarters is in Tallinn, Estonia, whilst its operational centre is in Strasbourg, France. In addition, eu-LISA also has a technical backup site in St Johann im Pongau, Austria, and a liaison office in Brussels, Belgium. The current executive director is Krum Garkov, who assumed his role in November 2012.

Management board
The management board composed of EU Member States and the European Commission oversees the agency's activities. Observer status on the board is given to Switzerland, Iceland, Norway, and Liechtenstein, as well as representatives  of Eurojust, Europol, and Frontex. The Management Board's Chairperson, since June 2018, is the Hungarian representative to the board, Zsolt Szolnoki.

Mandate

eu-LISA and the AFSJ Information Systems  
As of 2012, eu-LISA has played a critical role in the operational management of large-scale IT systems and databases vital for the security of the European Union. These include the already existing Eurodac, SIS and VIS systems, as well as systems currently under development, such as ECRIS-TCN, EES and ETIAS. These systems, and the interoperability they provide, promise to change the landscape of the Justice and Home Affairs (JHA) area in Europe. The technologies being developed by eu-LISA will help the move away from the current outdated silo solutions and move towards the new holistic approaches that still fully respect the original objectives and data protection guarantees of the individual systems. eu-LISA works closely with Member States, the European Institutions and other AFSJ Agencies to ensure that the technical and procedural solutions applied optimally cover business requirements while remaining technically feasible. The eu-LISA ensures that the freedom, security, and justice management systems in Europe will be conserved for generations to come.

eu-LISA aims to ensure the interoperability and compliance with data protection standards of all IT system under its management, whilst providing improved and secure access to EU Member State authorities to information stored at EU-level.

eu-LISA is responsible for following AFSJ Information Systems:

Eurodac - the European Dactyloscopy  Database 
Eurodac is the European Dactyloscopy Database, managed by eu-LISA, which assists in the processing of European asylum applications. It is a centralised database that collects and handles the digitalised fingerprints of asylum seekers and irregular migrants. It helps determine the Member State responsible for examining an asylum application. National asylum authorities use Eurodac to store new fingerprints and compare existing records on asylum seekers. This aids the detection of multiple asylum applications and thus reduces “asylum shopping”. Law enforcement authorities and Europol can also access the system – under strict conditions – to prevent, detect and investigate terrorist and other serious criminal offences.

New legislative proposals foresee extending the scope of Eurodac to allow for the storage of, and the possibility to search by, biometric data of irregular migrants found illegally staying in the EU, thus facilitating returns. Reinforcing Eurodac will ensure the system will continue to be a valuable tool for officers deployed at borders and hotspots.

SIS II - the second generation Schengen Information System 
The Schengen Information System (SIS) is a large-scale IT system, managed by eu-LISA, which supports internal security and the exchange of information on persons and objects between national police, border control, customs, visa and judicial authorities. Since the Schengen area has no internal borders, SIS assists national authorities in sharing information with their European counterparts whilst performing border checks, and in the fight against cross-border crime and terrorism, all of which with respect to the latest EU data protection requirements. In 2018, eu-LISA launched the Automated Fingerprint Identification System (AFIS), which introduced a biometric search capability in SIS, allowing for the identification of persons of interest solely using fingerprints. 

The latest legislation foresees improvements within SIS to better address counter-terrorism and irregular migration. A more extensive use of biometric data and the creation of new categories of alerts, as well as the inclusion of more items in the already existing categories, is also foreseen. Wider access to Europol and access for Frontex hotspot teams is also a part of the legislation.

VIS - the Visa Information System 
The Visa Information System (VIS) is a large-scale IT system, managed by eu-LISA, which supports the implementation of the European Union’s common visa policy and facilitates border checks and consular cooperation in Europe. The system enables dedicated national authorities to enter and consult data, including biometrics, for short-stay visas for the Schengen Area. The system helps reduce “visa shopping” and irregular migration and contributes to the prevention of threats to the internal security of Member States. VIS provides quicker and clearer procedures for travellers requiring a visa to enter the Schengen Area. The system assists authorities in processing asylum applications and identifying persons who may not, or may no longer, fulfil the conditions to enter or stay in the Schengen area.

The European Commission has proposed changes to legislation that will expand the scope of VIS by adding long stay-visas and residence permits to the system. Said proposals will also allow for more thorough background checks on visa applicants, thus closing security information gaps through better information exchange between Member States.

EES - the Entry/Exit System 
The Entry/Exit System (EES) is a new large-scale IT system being developed by eu-LISA that will enable the recording of entry and exit of third country nationals (TCN) to and from the Schengen Area. The system will replace the current practice of manual stamping of passports with electronic registration in a central database of biographic and biometric information, as well as the date and place of entry/exit for visits up to 90 days. 

The system aims to modernise and increase automation at border controls, to strengthen internal security and fight terrorism and organised crime. This will help Member States to deal with ever-increasing traveller flows without having to supplement the number of border guards. EES will allow for better monitoring of authorised stays and the identification of possible over-stayers.

ETIAS - the European Travel Information and Authorisation System 
The European Travel Information and Authorisation System (ETIAS) is a new IT system for EU border management being developed by eu-LISA, which will improve the security and safety aspects of travelling to or through the Schengen Area. Once operational, ETIAS will require that all visa-exempt third country nationals planning to travel to the Schengen Area apply for pre-travel authorisation online. Similar to systems already existing in the USA, Canada and Australia, a valid passport, a credit card and minimal personal information will be needed. The information submitted will be automatically processed against existing EU databases (Eurodac, SIS and VIS), future systems EES and ECRIS-TCN, and relevant Interpol databases. This will enable advance verification of potential security, irregular migration and public health risks. 

The ETIAS will reduce procedures and bordercrossing times, strengthen border management, reinforce the EU’s visa liberalisation policy, help prevent irregular migration and fortify the fight against terrorism and organised crime.

ECRIS-TCN - the European Criminal Records Information System - Third-Country Nationals 
The European Criminal Records Information System – Third Country Nationals (ECRIS-TCN), to be developed by euLISA, will be a centralised hit/no-hit system to supplement the existing EU criminal records database (ECRIS) on non-EU nationals convicted in the European Union. Once operational, it will allow Member States to quickly find out in which other Member State(s) information on previous convictions of a non-EU national is stored.

The system will provide judges, prosecutors and other relevant authorities with easy access to comprehensive information on an individual’s criminal history, no matter in which Member State that person was convicted in the past. Efficient exchange of criminal records information is instrumental in combating cross-border crime. ECRIS-TCN will contribute to implementing the principle of mutual recognition of sentences and judicial decisions in a common area of justice and security where people move freely, such as the Schengen Area. The ECRIS-TCN System is scheduled to be ready in conjunction with the roll-out of the components required to implement interoperability.

CEAS - the Common European Asylum System

See also
Agencies of the European Union
EASO
Frontex
Eurojust
Europol

References

External links
Official website
Eu Agencies Network

Agencies of the European Union
Information technology organizations based in Europe